Paul-Jacques de Bruyères-Chalabre (Castelnaudary, 25 May 1734 — Chalabre, 6 July 1821) was a French Navy officer. He notably captained the 74-gun Illustre at the Battle of Trincomalee from 25 August to 3 September 1782  and at the Battle of Cuddalore on 20 June 1783.

Biography 
Bruyères was born to the family of Count de Bruyères Chalabre. He joined the Navy as a Garde-Marine on 11 February 1751, and was promoted to lieutenant on 1 October 1764, and to captain on 4 April 1777.

With the rank of captain, Bruyères commanded the 80-gun Tonnant in the Yorktown campaign. He later captained the 74-gun Zélé and was part of the French blockade during Siege of Savannah in 1779. His role in the War of American Independence earned him a membership in the Society of the Cincinnati.

He then took part in the Indian Ocean campaign under Suffren, commanding the 74-gun Illustre at the Battle of Trincomalee from 25 August to 3 September 1782,  where he was wounded.  Suffren made flattering reports on his conduct in the battle.  He went to fight at the Battle of Cuddalore on 20 June 1783. 

After the  Peace of Paris put an end to the war in 1783, he returned to France in 1784. He was amongst the captains that Suffren recommended for promotion He received a 600-livre pension in recognition of his service. On 1 May 1786, he was promoted to Chef de Division.

Bruyères resigned from the Navy on 15 March 1792. During the Reign of Terror, he was arrested, but was released after the Thermidorian Reaction. He then fled France to become an émigré.

After the Bourbon Restauration, Bruyères-Chalabre returned to France. On 13 June 1814, he was promoted to rear admiral. In December 1814, he became a vice-admiral.

From November 1815, he served as a Deputy for Aude in the Chamber of Deputies.

Notes

References

Bibliography

External links 
 

French Navy officers
1719 births
1787 deaths